The 2021 Road to the Kentucky Derby was a series of races through which horses qualified for the 2021 Kentucky Derby, which was held on May 1. The field for the Derby is limited to 20 horses, with up to four 'also eligibles' in case of a late withdrawal from the field. There were three separate paths for horses to take to qualify for the Derby: the main Road consisting of races in North America (plus one in Dubai), the Japan Road consisting of four races in Japan, and seven European races in England, Ireland and France. The top four finishers in the specified races received points, with higher points awarded in the major prep races in March and April. Earnings in non-restricted stakes races acted as a tie breaker.

The 2020 Road to the Kentucky Derby suffered major disruptions due to the COVID-19 pandemic, which led to the postponement of the 2020 Derby itself to September. For 2021, the main Road to the Kentucky Derby will instead resemble the 2019 Road to the Kentucky Derby, consisting of 36 races, 20 races for the Kentucky Derby Prep Season and 16 races for the Kentucky Derby Championship Season except for the following changes: 

 The John Battaglia Memorial Stakes, which was added to the Road in 2020, was retained as part of the Prep season for 2021
 The Jeff Ruby Steaks, which in 2019 and 2020 was a "Wild Card" event, was moved to the Championship Second leg of series with an increase of qualification points – with 1st 100 points, 2nd 40 points, 3rd 20 points and 4th 10 points

For the 2021 Road to the Kentucky Derby, horses which ran in qualifying events with the medication furosemide (Lasix) did not receive any qualification points.

Standings

The following table shows the points earned in the eligible races for the main series and the leaderboard rank as of April 25. The Kentucky Derby was won by Mandaloun, who qualified in a Sixth place finished in the Louisiana Derby. He was new winner of the race after the original winner Medina Spirit was disqualified after testing positive for Betamethasone. The trainer of Medina Spirit Bob Baffert got suspended by Churchill Downs for two years.

*Mandaloun named was new winner of the race on February 12, 2022 after the original winner Medina Spirit was disqualified after testing positive for Betamethasone. The trainer of Medina Spirit, Bob Baffert got suspended by Churchill Downs for two years.

Legend:

Winner of Kentucky Derby in bold

Prep season
Note: 1st=10 points; 2nd=4 points; 3rd=2 points; 4th=1 point (except the Breeders' Cup Juvenile: 1st=20 points; 2nd=8 points; 3rd=4 points; 4th=2 points)

Championship series events

The following events were included as part of the Championship series.

First leg of series
Note: 1st=50 points; 2nd=20 points; 3rd=10 points; 4th=5 points

Second leg of series
These races are the major preps for the Kentucky Derby, and are thus weighted more heavily. Note: 1st=100 points; 2nd=40 points; 3rd=20 points; 4th=10 points

"Wild Card" event
Note: 1st=20 points; 2nd=8 points; 3rd=4 points; 4th=2 points

Japan Road to the Kentucky Derby

The Japan Road to the Kentucky Derby is intended to provide a place in the Derby starting gate to the top finisher in the series. If the connections of that horse decline the invitation, their place is offered to the second-place finisher and so on through the top four finishers. If neither of the top four accept, this place in the starting gate reverts to the horses on the main road to the Derby. 

Note: 
Cattleya Sho:  1st=10 points; 2nd=4 points; 3rd=2 points; 4th=1 point
Zen-Nippon Nisai Yushun:  1st=20 points; 2nd=8 points; 3rd=4 points; 4th=2 points
Hyacinth: 1st=30 points; 2nd=12 points; 3rd=6 points; 4th=3 points
Fukuyru : 1st=40 points; 2nd=16 points; 3rd=8 points; 4th=4 points

Qualification Table
The top four horses (colored brown within the standings) are eligible to participate in the Kentucky Derby provided the horse is nominated.

Notes: 
 brown highlight – qualified
 grey highlight – did not qualify

European Road to the Kentucky Derby

The European Road to the Kentucky Derby is designed on a similar basis to the Japan Road and is intended to provide a place in the Derby starting gate to the top finisher in the series. If the connections of that horse decline the invitation, their place is offered to the second-place finisher and so on. If neither of the top four accept, this place in the starting gate reverts to the horses on the main road to the Derby.

The series consists of seven races – four run on the turf in late 2020 when the horses are age two, plus three races run on a synthetic surface in early 2021.

Note:
 the four races in 2020 for two-year-olds: 1st=10 points; 2nd=4 points; 3rd=2 points; 4th=1 point
 the first two races in 2021: 1st=20 points; 2nd=8 points; 3rd=4 points; 4th=2 points
 The Cardinal Condition Stakes: 1st=30 points; 2nd=12 points; 3rd=6 points; 4th=3 points

Qualification Table
The top four horses (colored brown within the standings) are eligible to participate in the Kentucky Derby provided the horse is nominated.

Notes: 
 brown highlight – qualified
 grey highlight – did not qualify

See also
2021 Road to the Kentucky Oaks

Notes

References

External links

Road to the Kentucky Derby, 2021
Road to the Kentucky Derby
Road to the Kentucky Derby
Road to the Kentucky Derby